Drängarna (The Farmhands) is a Swedish rock-pop/dansband that was formed in 1995, with group members are Yala Gunter, Sunna Robert, Lasse i Torp (Lars McLachlan) and Olav i Fossen (Olav Fossheim). Drängarna now consists of Johan i Backen (Johan Sahlén) on vocals, Sunna Robert (Robert Åhlin) on violin and vocals, and Olav i Fossen on the accordion.

"Vill du bli min fru" was their most well-known song in 1995. The single sold around 35,000 copies and the album sold around 100,000 copies. Other hit songs include "Kung över ängarna" and "Snickerboa".

In September 2006, they released their album Himlen kan vänta, with hit songs "Raggaren", "Såpornas kung", and "Ei saa peittää".

They participated in Melodifestivalen 2020 with the song "Piga och dräng".

Legal issues
Drängarna's greatest hit song, "Vill du bli min fru", was subject to some controversy in 2002, when it was decided by the Supreme Court of Sweden that an eight-bar violin part was plagiarized from a song by the group Landslaget. This was the first copyright infringement case tried in Sweden. As a result, Drängarna's label Regatta was forced to pay damages and courtroom costs.

Discography

Singles

References

External links
Homepage

Swedish musical groups
Melodifestivalen contestants of 2020